New York City's 10th City Council district is one of 51 districts in the New York City Council. It is currently represented by Democrat Carmen De La Rosa, who took office in 2022.

Geography
District 10 covers the northernmost neighborhoods of Manhattan, including Washington Heights, Inwood, and Marble Hill.

The district overlaps with Manhattan Community Board 12 and, because of Marble Hill (politically part of Manhattan but geographically part of the Bronx), Bronx Community Boards 7 and 8. It is contained entirely within New York's 13th congressional district, and also overlaps with the 30th and 31st districts of the New York State Senate and the 71st and 72nd districts of the New York State Assembly.

At over 80 percent Hispanic, the district has by far the highest Hispanic population of any City Council district in Manhattan. Dominican Americans are particularly concentrated in the district; its four most recent councilmembers have all been Dominican.

Recent election results

2021
In 2019, voters in New York City approved Ballot Question 1, which implemented ranked-choice voting in all local elections. Under the new system, voters have the option to rank up to five candidates for every local office. Voters whose first-choice candidates fare poorly will have their votes redistributed to other candidates in their ranking until one candidate surpasses the 50 percent threshold. If one candidate surpasses 50 percent in first-choice votes, then ranked-choice tabulations will not occur.

2017

2013

References

New York City Council districts